Daniel Denison (born 14 February 1985) is an English professional golfer who plays on the Challenge Tour.

Denison broke both of his legs in a car accident in 2007, an injury that threatened his career. He joined the Challenge Tour in 2009 where he struggled in his rookie year. He improved in 2010, finishing 39th on the Order of Merit while recording a runner up finish at the Kärnten Golf Open. He picked up his first win in 2011 at the ECCO Tour Championship. He also recorded a runner up finish at the Saint-Omer Open.

Professional wins (1)

Challenge Tour wins (1)

*Note: The 2011 ECCO Tour Championship was shortened to 54 holes due to weather.
1Co-sanctioned by the Danish Golf Tour

Results in major championships

Note: Denison only played in The Open Championship.
CUT = missed the half-way cut

Team appearances
Amateur
Jacques Léglise Trophy (representing Great Britain and Ireland): 2003 (winners)

See also
2011 Challenge Tour graduates

External links

English male golfers
European Tour golfers
Sportspeople from Leeds
1985 births
Living people